is a passenger railway station in the city of Narita, Chiba Japan, operated by the East Japan Railway Company (JR East).

Lines
Kuzumi Station is served by the Narita Line, and is located 20.0 kilometers from the terminus of line at Sakura Station.

Station layout
The station consists of dual opposed side platforms connected by a footbridge to a small one-story station building. The station is unattended.

Platforms

History
Kuzumi Station was opened on July 1, 1901 as a station on the Narita Railway for both passenger and freight operations. The Narita Railway was nationalised on September 1, 1920, becoming part of the Japanese Government Railway (JGR). After World War II, the JGR became the Japan National Railways (JNR). Scheduled freight operations were suspended from October 1, 1962. The station has been unattended since July 1, 1970, and a new station building was completed in 1980. The station was absorbed into the JR East network upon the privatization of the Japan National Railways (JNR) on April 1, 1987.

Passenger statistics
In fiscal 2019, the station was used by an average of 809 passengers daily (boarding passengers only)..

Surrounding area
 Narita Municipal Kuzumi Junior High School
 Narita Municipal Kuzumi Elementary School
 Kuzumi Post Office

See also
 List of railway stations in Japan

References

External links

JR East station information 

Railway stations in Chiba Prefecture
Railway stations in Japan opened in 1902
Railway stations in Narita, Chiba